Brad Wright (born July 10, 1959) is an American football coach. He served as head football coach at Texas State University–San Marcos—now known as Texas State University—from 2007 to 2010.

Wright is a 1981 graduate of Texas State—then known as Southwest Texas State University—and was a member of the 1980 Bobcats team that won a Lone Star Conference championship. He originally walked-on as a wide receiver, played a season at running back, and then moved to the other side of the ball where he became a defensive leader at free safety.

Wright went on to become a successful high school football coach. In 2004, Wright was hired by Texas State as an assistant to head coach David Bailiff.  Bailiff and Wright were teammates at Southwest Texas State from 1978 to 1980. When Bailiff left for Rice University in 2007, Wright took over as head coach and held the job until he was fired on November 23,

Head coaching record

College

References

1959 births
Living people
American football running backs
American football safeties
Texas State Bobcats football coaches
Texas State Bobcats football players
High school football coaches in Texas
People from Pearsall, Texas